The Canon EOS-1D X Mark II was the company's 20-megapixel full-frame DSLR flagship camera, announced on February 1, 2016, by Canon with an MSRP of US$5,999.00. It is the successor to the Canon EOS-1D X, which was released in 2012.

On January 6, 2020, Canon introduced the Canon EOS-1D X Mark III as the successor to the EOS-1D X Mark II.

Features
New features over the Canon EOS-1D X are:
 DCI 4K (4096×2160) with up to 60 fps (59.94 fps) up to 29'59" (4K can only be recorded internally in MJPEG, the HDMI output is limited to 1080p)
 Continuous shooting rate of up to 14 frames per second with full autofocus; 16 fps in live view with locked focus and exposure. These rates are available when using the new LP-E19 battery. The EOS-1D X Mk II accepts the LP-E4N batteries of the Mk I and LP-E4 batteries of the 1D Mark IV, but burst mode reverts to the Mk I maximum of 12/14 fps.
 Full HD video (1920×1080) up to 120 fps (119.9 fps)
 All AF points support to a maximum aperture of f/8
 Digital lens optimizer for JPEG shooting.
 AI Servo AF III
 Continuous red illumination of all AF points
 Support for CFast (a variant of CompactFlash) memory cards
 Built-in GPS used for geotag information and syncing to UTC time
 One additional stop of ISO range with it being expandable to 409600
 Anti-flicker feature (introduced with the EOS 7D Mark II) – camera can be set to adjust the moment of exposure to compensate for flickering electric lighting
 A touchscreen LCD, which allows videographers to select the camera's AF point before and during video recording.
 Wi-Fi for wireless file transfer (with wireless transmitter)

Comparison with the EOS-1D X

See also
Canon EOS-1D C

References

External links

Official web page
Sample Images & Movies

1D X Mk II
Cameras introduced in 2016
Full-frame DSLR cameras